Carroll County is a county located in the U.S. state of Iowa. As of the 2020 census, the population was 20,760. Its county seat is Carroll. The county is named in honor of Charles Carroll of Carrollton, signer of the Declaration of Independence.

History
Carroll County was formed on January 15, 1851, from sections of Pottawattamie County.  It was named after Charles Carroll of Carrollton, Maryland, the only Roman Catholic and longest-living signer of the Declaration of Independence.  In 1855, the county government was established in Carrollton and in 1858, the first courthouse was built.  In 1869, the seat was moved to Carroll City (today Carroll) which was centrally located and connected to the Chicago and North Western Transportation Company. The courthouse was destroyed in 1886 by fire.  The present courthouse was erected in 1965.  However the courthouse is set to go under construction in the near future.

Geography

Major highways
 U.S. Highway 30
 U.S. Highway 71
 Iowa Highway 141

Adjacent counties
Sac County  (northwest)
Calhoun County  (northeast)
Greene County  (east)
Guthrie County  (southeast)
Audubon County  (south)
Crawford County  (west)

Demographics

2020 census
There were 9,490 housing units of which 8,764 were occupied.

2010 census
There were 9,376 housing units, of which 8,683 were occupied.

2000 census

As of the census of 2000, there were 21,421 people, 8,486 households, and 5,668 families residing in the county.  The population density was 38 people per square mile (15/km2).  There were 9,019 housing units at an average density of 16 per square mile (6/km2).  The racial makeup of the county was 98.87% White, 0.18% Black or African American, 0.10% Native American, 0.34% Asian, 0.20% from other races, and 0.31% from two or more races.  0.54% of the population were Hispanic or Latino of any race.

There were 8,486 households, out of which 32.90% had children under the age of 18 living with them, 57.00% were married couples living together, 6.80% had a female householder with no husband present, and 33.20% were non-families. 29.60% of all households were made up of individuals, and 15.50% had someone living alone who was 65 years of age or older.  The average household size was 2.46 and the average family size was 3.07.

In the county, the population was spread out, with 26.90% under the age of 18, 7.40% from 18 to 24, 25.90% from 25 to 44, 21.00% from 45 to 64, and 18.70% who were 65 years of age or older.  The median age was 39 years. For every 100 females there were 95.10 males.  For every 100 females age 18 and over, there were 92.00 males.

The median income for a household in the county was $37,275, and the median income for a family was $47,040. Males had a median income of $30,074 versus $21,528 for females. The per capita income for the county was $18,595.  About 4.50% of families and 6.50% of the population were below the poverty line, including 6.10% of those under age 18 and 8.20% of those age 65 or over.

Communities

Arcadia
Breda
Carroll
Coon Rapids
Dedham
Glidden
Halbur
Lanesboro
Lidderdale
Manning
Ralston
Templeton
Willey

Townships
Carroll County is divided into sixteen townships:

 Arcadia
 Eden
 Ewoldt
 Glidden
 Grant
 Jasper
 Kniest
 Maple River
 Newton
 Pleasant Valley
 Richland
 Roselle
 Sheridan
 Union
 Washington
 Wheatland

Population ranking
The population ranking of the following table is based on the 2020 census of Carroll County.
† county seat

Politics

See also

National Register of Historic Places listings in Carroll County, Iowa

References

External links

Carroll County government's website
St. Anthony Regional Hospital

 
1851 establishments in Iowa
Populated places established in 1851